Finland competed at the 2019 European Games, in Minsk, Belarus from 21 to 30 June 2019. Finland has previously competed at the 2015 European Games in Baku, Azerbaijan, where it won 1 medal.

Medalists

Archery

Recurve

Compound

Badminton

Boxing

Men

Women

Gymnastics

Judo

Karate

Shooting

Men

Women

Mixed team

Table tennis

Wrestling

Men's Freestyle

Men's Greco-Roman

References

Nations at the 2019 European Games
European Games
2019